Apolipoprotein B (ApoB) is a protein that in humans is encoded by the  gene.

Function 
Apolipoprotein B is the primary apolipoprotein of chylomicrons, VLDL, Lp(a), IDL, and LDL particles (LDL—commonly known as "bad cholesterol" when in reference to both heart disease and vascular disease in general), which is responsible for carrying fat molecules (lipids), including cholesterol, around the body to all cells within all tissues. While all the functional roles of ApoB within the LDL (and all larger) particles remain somewhat unclear, it is the primary organizing protein (of the entire complex shell enclosing/carrying fat molecules within) component of the particles and is absolutely required for the formation of these particles. What is also clear is that the ApoB on the LDL particle acts as a ligand for LDL receptors in various cells throughout the body (i.e., less formally, ApoB indicates fat carrying particles are ready to enter any cells with ApoB receptors and deliver fats carried within into the cells).

Through mechanisms only partially understood, high levels of ApoB, especially associated with the higher LDL particle concentrations, are the primary driver of plaques that cause vascular disease (atherosclerosis), commonly first becoming obviously symptomatic as heart disease, stroke and many other body wide complications after decades of progression. There is considerable evidence that concentrations of ApoB and especially the NMR assay (specific for LDL-particle concentrations) are superior indicators of vascular/heart disease driving physiology than either total cholesterol or LDL-cholesterol (as long promoted by the  NIH starting in the early 1970s). However, primarily for historic cost/complexity reasons, cholesterol, and estimated LDL-cholesterol by calculation, remains the most commonly promoted lipid test for the risk factor of atherosclerosis. ApoB is routinely measured using immunoassays such as ELISA or nephelometry. Refined and automated NMR methods allow measurement distinctions between the many different ApoB particles.

Genetic disorders
High levels of ApoB are related to heart disease.
Hypobetalipoproteinemia is a genetic disorder that can be caused by a mutation in the ApoB gene, APOB. Abetalipoproteinaemia is usually caused by a mutation in the MTP gene, MTP.

Mutations in gene APOB100 can also cause familial hypercholesterolemia, a hereditary (autosomal dominant) form of metabolic disorder hypercholesterolemia.

Mouse studies
Mice have been used as model organisms in ApoB study as they express an equivalent protein known as mouse ApoB (mApoB). Mice overexpressing mApoB have increased levels of LDL and decreased levels of HDL. Mice containing only one functional copy of the mApoB gene show the opposite effect, being resistant to hypercholesterolemia. Mice containing no functional copies of the gene are not viable.

Molecular biology 
The protein occurs in the plasma in 2 main isoforms, ApoB48 and ApoB100. The first is synthesized exclusively by the small intestine, the second by the liver. ApoB-100 is the largest of the apoB group of proteins, consisting of 4563 amino acids. Both isoforms are coded by APOB and by a single mRNA transcript larger than 16 kb. ApoB48 is generated when a stop codon (UAA) at residue 2153 is created by RNA editing. There appears to be a trans-acting tissue-specific splicing gene that determines which isoform is ultimately produced. Alternatively, there is some evidence that a cis-acting element several thousand bp upstream determines which isoform is produced.

As a result of the RNA editing, ApoB48 and ApoB100 share a common N-terminal sequence, but ApoB48 lacks ApoB100's C-terminal LDL receptor binding region. In fact, ApoB48 is so-called because it constitutes 48% of the sequence for ApoB100.

ApoB 48 is a unique protein to chylomicrons from the small intestine. After most of the lipids in the chylomicron have been absorbed, ApoB48 returns to the liver as part of the chylomicron remnant, where it is endocytosed and degraded.

Clinical significance

Benefits

Role in innate immune system 
Very low-density lipoproteins and low-density lipoproteins interfere with the quorum sensing system that upregulates genes required for invasive Staphylococcus aureus infection. The mechanism of antagonism entails binding ApoB, to a S. aureus autoinducer pheromone, preventing signaling through its receptor. Mice deficient in ApoB are more susceptible to invasive  bacterial infection.

Adverse effects

Role in insulin resistance 
Overproduction of apolipoprotein B can result in lipid-induced endoplasmic reticulum stress and insulin resistance in the liver.

Role in lipoproteins and atherosclerosis 
ApoB100 is found in lipoproteins originating from the liver (VLDL, IDL, LDL). Importantly, there is one ApoB100 molecule per hepatic-derived lipoprotein. Hence, using that fact, one can quantify the number of lipoprotein particles by noting the total ApoB100 concentration in the circulation. Since there is one and only one ApoB100 per particle, the number of particles is reflected by the ApoB100 concentration. The same technique can be applied to individual lipoprotein classes (e.g. LDL) and thereby enable one to count them as well.

It is well established that ApoB100 levels are associated with coronary heart disease, they are a far better predictor of it than are LDL-C concentrations. Reason: LDL-C does not reflect actual particle concentrations & cholesterol cannot dissolve or move (in water) without particles to carry it. A simple way to understand this observation is the fact that ApoB100, one per particle, reflects actual lipoprotein particle concentration (independent of their cholesterol, or other lipid content). In this way, one can understand that the number of ApoB100-containing lipoprotein particles which can carry lipids into the artery walls is a key determinant, driver of atherosclerosis and heart disease.

One way to explain the above is to consider that large numbers of lipoprotein particles, and, in particular, large numbers of LDL particles, lead to competition at the ApoB100 receptor (i.e. LDL receptor) of peripheral cells. Since such competition will prolong the residence time of LDL particles in the circulation, it may lead to greater opportunity for them to undergo oxidation and/or other chemical modifications. Such modifications may lessen the particles' ability to be cleared by the classic LDL receptor and/or increase their ability to interact with so-called "scavenger" receptors. The net result is the shunting of LDL particles to these scavenger receptors. Scavenger receptors typically are found on macrophages, with cholesterol-laden macrophages being better known as "foam cells". Foam cells characterize atherosclerotic lesions. In addition to this possible mechanism of foam cell generation, an increase in the levels of chemically modified LDL particles may also lead to an increase in endothelial damage. This occurs as a result of modified-LDL's toxic effect on vascular endothelium as well as its ability both to recruit immune effector cells and to promote platelet activation.

The INTERHEART study found that the ApoB100 / ApoA1 ratio is more effective at predicting heart attack risk, in patients who had had an acute myocardial infarction, than either the ApoB100 or ApoA1 measure alone. (ApoA1 is the major HDL protein.) In the general population this remains unclear although in a recent study ApoB was the strongest risk marker for cardiovascular events.

Interactions 
ApoB has been shown to interact with apo(a), PPIB, Calcitonin receptor and HSP90B1. Interaction of ApoB with proteoglycans, collagen, and fibronectin is believed to cause atherosclerosis.

Interactive pathway map

Regulation
The expression of APOB is regulated by cis-regulatory elements in the APOB 5′ UTR and 3′ UTR.

RNA editing
The mRNA of this protein is subject to cytidine to uridine (C to U) site-specific RNA editing. ApoB100 and ApoB48 are encoded by the same gene, however, the differences in the translated proteins are not due to alternative splicing but are due to the tissue-specific RNA editing event.
ApoB mRNA editing was the first example of editing observed in vertebrates. Editing of ApoB mRNA occurs in all placental mammals. Editing occurs post transcriptionally as the nascent polynucleotides do not contain edited nucleosides.

Type
C to U editing of ApoB mRNA requires an editing complex or holoenzyme (editosome) consisting of the C to U-editing enzyme Apolipoprotein B mRNA editing enzyme, catalytic polypeptide 1 (ApoBEC-1) as well as other auxiliary factors. ApoBEC-1 is a protein that in humans is encoded by the APOBEC1 gene.[1]It is a member of the cytidine deaminase family. ApoBEC-1 alone is not sufficient for the editing of ApoB mRNA  and requires at least  one of these  auxiliary factors, APOBEC1 complementation factor (A1CF) for editing to occur. A1CF contains 3 non identical repeats. It acts as the RNA binding subunit and directs ApoBEC-1 to the ApoB mRNA downstream of the edited cytidine. Other auxiliary factors  are known to be part of the holoenzyme. Some of these  proteins have been identified. these are CUG binding protein 2 (CUGBP2), SYNCRIP (glycine-arginine-tyrosine-rich RNA binding protein, GRY-RBP), heterogeneous nuclear ribonucleoprotein (hnRNP)-C1 (HNRNPC), ApoBEC-1 binding protein ABBP1 (HNRNPAB), ABBP2, KH-type splicing regulatory binding protein (KHSRP), Bcl-2-associated athanogene 4 (BAG4), and auxiliary factor (AUX)240. All these proteins have been identified using detection assays and have all been demonstrated to interact with either ApoBEC-1, A1CF, or ApoB RNA. The function of these auxiliary proteins in the editing complex are unknown. As well as editing ApoB mRNA, the ApoBEC-1 editsome also edits the mRNA of NF1. mRNA editing of ApoB mRNA is the best defined example of this type of C to U  RNA editing in humans.

Location
Despite being a 14,000 residue long transcript, a single cytidine is targeted for editing. Within the ApoB mRNA a sequence consisting of 26 nucleotides necessary for editing is found. This is known as the editing motif. These nucleotides (6662–6687) were determined to be essential by site specific mutagenesis experiments. An 11 nucleotide portion of this sequence 4–5 nucleotides downstream from the editing site is an important region known as the mooring sequence. A region called the spacer element is found 2–8 nucleotides between the edited nucleoside and this mooring sequence. There is also a regulatory sequence 3′ to the editing site. The active site of ApoBEC-1, the catalytic component of the editing holoenzyme is thought to bind to an AU rich region of the mooring sequence with the aid of ACF in binding the complex to the mRNA.
The edited cytidine residue is located at nucleotide 6666 located in exon 26 of the gene. Editing at this site results in a codon change from a Glutamine codon (CAA) to an inframe stop codon (UAA).  Computer modelling has detected for editing to occur, the edited Cytidine  is located in a loop. The selection of the edited cytidine is also highly dependent on this secondary structure of the surrounding RNA. There are also some indications that this loop region is formed between the mooring sequence and the 3′ regulatory region of the ApoB mRNA. The predicted secondary structure formed by ApoB mRNA is thought to allow for contact between the  residue to be edited and the active site of APOBEC1 as well as for binding of ACF and other auxiliary factors associated with the editosome.

Regulation 
Editing of ApoB mRNA in humans is tissue regulated, with ApoB48 being the main ApoB protein of the small intestine in humans. It occurs in lesser amounts in the colon, kidney and stomach along with the non edited version.
Editing is also developmentally regulated with the non edited version only being translated early in development but the edited form increases during development in the tissues where editing can occur.
Editing levels of ApoB mRNA have been shown to vary in response to changes in diet. exposure to alcohol and hormone levels.

Conservation 
ApoB mRNA editing also occurs in mice, and rats. In contrast to humans editing occurs in liver in mice and rats up to a frequency of 65%. It has not been observed in birds or lesser species.

Consequences

Structure
Editing results in a codon change creating an in-frame stop codon leading to translation of a truncated protein, ApoB48. This stop codon results in the translation of a protein that lacks the carboxyl terminus which contains the protein's LDLR binding domain. The full protein ApoB100 which has nearly 4500 amino acids is present in VLDL and LDL. Since many parts of ApoB100 are in an amphipathic condition, the structure of some of its domains is dependent on underlying lipid conditions. However, it is known to have the same overall folding in LDL having five main domains. Recently the first structure of LDL at human body temperature in native condition has been found using cryo-electron microscopy at a resolution of 16 Angstrom. The overall folding of ApoB-100 has been confirmed and some heterogeneity in the local structure of its domains have been mapped.

Function 
Editing is restricted to those transcripts expressed in the small intestine. This shorter version of the protein has a function specific to the small intestine. The main function of the full length liver expressed ApoB100 is as a ligand for activation of the LDL-R. However, editing results in a protein lacking this LDL-R binding region of the protein. This alters the function of the protein and the shorter ApoB48 protein as specific functions relative to the small intestine.
ApoB48 is identical to the amino-terminal 48% of ApoB100. The function of this isoform is in fat absorption of  the small intestine and is involved in the synthesis, assembly and secretion of chylomicrons. These chylomicrons transport dietary lipids to tissues while the remaining chylomicrons along with associated residual lipids are in 2–3 hours taken up by the liver via the interaction of apolipoprotein E (ApoE) with lipoprotein receptors. It is the dominant ApoB protein in the small intestine of most mammals. It is a key protein in the exogenous pathway of lipoprotein metabolism. Intestinal proteins containing ApoB48 are metabolized to chylomicron remnant particles which are taken up by remnant receptors.

See also 
 Apolipoprotein A1
 ACAT2
 Cardiovascular disease
 Lipid metabolism

References

Further reading

External links 
 Database of RNA editing (DARNED).
 Applied Research on Apolipoprotein-B
 

Apolipoproteins